Friedrich Hermann Fahnert (18 January 1879, in Limbach – 10 June 1964) was a German military officer who served in World War I and as a  Luftwaffe general in World War II. He was the last of three officers to be appointed to the rank of General of air force communications troops.

Military career
Fahnert entered the Imperial Army as an officer cadet in the 2nd railway regiment, Berlin in 1900. He took part in the campaign against the Hereros and the Nama. He served throughout World War I and became a battalion commander. After the war, he was retained in the Reichswehr and transferred to the Luftwaffe in 1936. At the outbreak of World War II, he was the commander of the Air Signals Training School in Berlin. He took part in the Siege of Leningrad. He then commanded the Air Signals Training Division in France and was promoted to General der Luftnachrichtentruppe on 1 April 1945.

After World War II
On 2 May 1945, Fahnert was taken into British captivity in Lübeck and then held with other senior officers at Special Camp XI near Bridgend, South Wales until 5 December 1947. He then returned to Germany and lived in Baden-Baden until his death in 1964. A Bundeswehr barracks (Kaserne) in Karlsruhe was named after him in October 1964. In October 2016, it was renamed into "Kirchfeldkaserne".

Awards and distinctions
 German Cross in Silver 7 December 1942 General Leutnant, Higher Signals Leader, Luftflotte 1
 Prussian Crown Order 4th Class with Swords
 Prussian Iron Cross  1st Class (1914) with 1939 Bar
 Prussian Iron Cross  2nd Class (1914) with 1939 Bar
 War Merit Cross 1st Class with Swords
 War Merit Cross 2nd Class with Swords
 Saxon Albert Order Knight 1st Class with Crown and Swords
 Saxon Long Service Cross
 Cross of Honour for Combatants 1914–1918
 Southwest African Expedition Medal for Combatants 1904–1906
 Armed Forces Long Service Award 1st Class (25-year Service)
 Armed Forces Long Service Award 3rd Class (12-year Service)
 Austrian Military Merit Cross 3rd Class with War Decoration
 Germany Army Pilot's Badge World War I award
 Flyer's Commemorative Badge

References

1964 deaths
1879 births
People from Limbach-Oberfrohna
People from the Kingdom of Saxony
Generals of Air Force Communications Troops
Luftwaffe World War II generals
Prussian Army personnel
Schutztruppe personnel
Reichswehr personnel
Luftstreitkräfte personnel
German Army personnel of World War I
German prisoners of war in World War II held by the United Kingdom
Recipients of the clasp to the Iron Cross, 1st class
Military personnel from Saxony